Chintaman Vinayak Joshi (Devanagari: चिंतामण विनायक जोशी) (19 January 1892 - 21 November 1963) was a Marathi humorist and a researcher in Pali literature. He hailed from Maharashtra, India, and was popularly known as Chin. Vi. Joshi. Joshi was known for his humorous writing. He also was a scholar of Pali and Buddhism.

A Marathi movie "Sarkari Pahune", 1942, directed by Master Vinayak, based on Joshi's writings became very successful and later so did a Doordarshan serial Chimanrao Gundyabhau, 1977 based on his writings.

Most of Joshi's books are in print as of January 2017. S D Phadnis has been one of the illustrators for Joshi's books.

Early life and career
Joshi was born in Pune. After finishing his high school education in 1909 at Pune's Nutan Marathi Vidyalaya, he received a bachelor's degree in Philosophy from Fergusson College in 1913 and a master's degree in Pali and English literature from Mumbai University two years later.

During 1915-1919, Joshi taught in a high school, first, in Umaravati and then in Ratnagiri. in 1920, he joined a college in Baroda as a professor of Pali, English, and Marathi literature. For some years since 1928, he also worked part-time as a Director of Archives for the then princely state of Baroda. After retirement from the professorial work, he moved to Pune.

Literary work
Besides many collections of his humorous stories, Joshi wrote biographies, children's books, historical articles, and some other highly scholarly works.

His serious works include:

Manual of Pali (in English)
Jatakatil Nivadak Goshti (जातकातील निवडक गोष्टी)
'Buddha Sampradaya (बुद्ध संप्रदाय)
Shikawan (शिकवण)
Adich Hajar Warshampurvicha Samaj (अडीच हजार वर्षांपूर्वीचा समाज)
Ingraji Shishtachar (इंग्रजी शिष्टाचार)
Samshayache Jale (संशयाचे जाळे)

Joshi's humorous works include:
 चिमणरावाचे च-हाट
 आणखी चिमणराव
 तिसर्यांदा चिमणराव
 चौथे चिमणराव
 गुंड्याभाऊ
 मोरू आणि मैना
 विनोद चिंतामणी
 वायफळाचा मळा
 एरंडाचे गुर्‍हाळ
 ओसाडवाडीचे देव
 चार दिवस सुनेचे
 ना मारो पिचकारी
 घरबशे पळपुटे
 पाल्हाळ
 मेषपात्रे
 रहाटगाडगे
 लंकावैभव
 हापूस पायरी
 संचार
 बोरीबाभळी
 स्टेशनमास्तर
 आरसा
 संचार
 आमचा पण गाव
 सोळा आणे

Published books
 Jatakatil Nivadak Goshti, 1930
 Shakyamuni Gautam, 1935
 Erandache Gurhal, 1932
 Chimanravanche Charhat, 1933
 Vayphalacha Mala, 1936
 Aankhi Chimanrav, 1944
 Osadvadiche Dev, 1946
 Gundyabhau, 1947
 Lankavaibhav, 1947
 Rahatgadagan, 1955
 Hasyachintamani, 1961
 Boribhabali, 1962
 Buddhasampraday v shikvan, 1963

References

External links
 Chimanravanche Charhat book : https://bookstruck.app/book/2781
 Entry of C V Joshi in Marathi Wikipedia : https://mr.wikipedia.org/s/8qw
Entry of C V Joshi in Marathi Vishwakosh https://marathivishwakosh.maharashtra.gov.in/khandas/khand6/index.php/component/content/article?id=11485

1892 births
1963 deaths
Marathi people
Writers from Pune
Marathi-language writers
Indian humorists
20th-century Indian short story writers